A codex (pluralized as codexes by Games Workshop), in the Warhammer 40,000 tabletop wargame, is a rules supplement containing information concerning a particular army, environment, or worldwide campaign.

Codices for particular armies were introduced for the second edition of the game. The third edition rendered these obsolete, and a new series began, including introducing codices for battle zones and campaigns. Until superseded by newer versions, the 3rd edition and later codices remained valid for the newer editions of Warhammer 40,000. Games Workshop no longer produce campaign or battle zone codices, instead releasing 'expansions'. 'Codex' is now a term solely used for army books.

At the launch of 8th edition all previous codices were replaced with index books due to a major rules overhaul (as of November 2019 these indexes are no longer produced).  The indexes were subsequently replaced by a new series of codices.  As before, these codices remain valid until superseded by newer versions (currently the oldest valid codexes are Codex: Astra Militarum - 8th Edition and Codex: Craftworlds - 8th Edition, released simultaneously).

The format of the codices has varied somewhat over the years. The most common elements between iterations include:

 Background - Information about the force and its place in the Warhammer 40,000 universe. This includes artwork, short stories, and copies of fictional documents from the future.
 Miniature Showcase - Originally a hobby section providing information on collecting, building and painting an army. Later a selection of photographs of Citadel Miniatures painted by Games Workshop's 'Eavy Metal team.
 Rules - Delivered in varying forms between editions.  In earlier editions: a bestiary (descriptions of units, characters and vehicles with special rules and background information), alongside an army list (providing options and points costs for units in the bestiary).  Since 7th edition, rules for each unit have been delivered on a datasheet (a concise page detailing all stats, equipment, options and special rules for a unit).  All other army rules and points are listed separately in sections before and after the datasheets.

Codex supplements provide additional rules for sub-factions of a parent army.  These might include special characters or units and other special rules that are only available to that particular sub-faction.

Rules for models produced by Forgeworld are available as part of the Imperial Armour series of books, also published by Forgeworld.  Rules for models no longer supported by codices and supplements can be found in Warhammer Legends on the Warhammer Community website.

Current Books

Army Codices
The range of codices is regularly updated with new editions of armies and occasionally new army codices. Codices designed for a prior edition of Warhammer 40,000 are still valid in the current edition, unless a later version has replaced it. Codex Supplements have their parent faction noted in brackets.

9th Edition
9th Edition was released in July 2020.

8th Edition
8th Edition was released in June 2017.

Expansions
Expansions for Warhammer 40,000 provide alternative ways to play the game. Rules in expansions remain valid unless superseded by a newer publication.

9th Edition

8th Edition

Imperial Armour
For main article see Imperial Armour

Imperial Armour is a series of official rules supplements to Warhammer 40,000 Codices produced by Forge World, a subsidiary company of Games Workshop. Current, valid books:

Obsolete Books

Codices

8th Edition
8th Edition was released June 2017.

7th Edition
All codices were rendered obsolete by 8th edition Warhammer 40,000. 7th Edition was released May 2014. Codex Supplements have their parent faction noted in brackets.

6th Edition
6th Edition was released June 2012. Codex Supplements have their parent faction noted in brackets.

5th Edition
5th Edition was released in 2008.

4th Edition
4th Edition was released in 2004. Codex Supplements have their parent faction noted in brackets.

3rd Edition
3rd Edition was released in 1998. Codex Supplements have their parent faction noted in brackets.

2nd Edition
All codices were rendered obsolete by 3rd edition Warhammer 40,000. 2nd Edition was released in 1993.

Expansions/Supplements

8th Edition

7th Edition
All 7th Edition expansions were superseded by 8th Edition.

6th Edition

5th Edition

4th Edition

3rd Edition

Battlezone
Battlezone codices were rules supplements that dealt with a specialised combat environment, instead of an army. There was only ever one produced. However, material in Codex: Catachans provides rules for jungle warfare. The concept of a battlezone codex was replaced by Games Workshop's Expansions.

3rd Edition Events
The two event codices were released in association with the 2000 and 2003 Worldwide Campaigns. These codices provided background and special gaming rules for the event, along with four "supplemental army lists"; variant armies that required access to certain other codices for use.

Imperial Armour

References

Warhammer 40,000 rule books and supplements